Ataf Khawaja is a popular Danish rap artist, of Pakistani origin also known by the mononym Ataf

Biography
Ataf is involved in a youth hip-hop program in Tingbjerg, Denmark, which encourages immigrant teenagers in express themselves through music. When asked about his involvement in the program, Ataf said, "I want to show immigrant kids I'm evidence that you can make it happen.  You don't have to be a cab driver...(or) a pizza delivery boy." His music has common themes about making the world a better, more accepting place. He charted on the Danish Singles Chart in 2004 with "Bare en thug" and released his album Paraderne nede in 2005.

He has also appeared in the television sitcom Klovn (2005) and the feature Halalabad Blues (2002).

Discography
(credited as Ataf)

Albums

Singles

Sources

References

External links
Official website

Pakistani rappers
Danish rappers
K
Living people
Year of birth missing (living people)